The Journal of Child Health Care is a quarterly peer-reviewed medical journal covering the field of  paediatric health care. The editor-in-chief is Dr. Stephen McKeever (University of Melbourne). The journal was established in 1997 and is published by SAGE Publications in association with the Association of British Paediatric Nurses.

Abstracting and indexing 
Journal of Child Health Care is abstracted and indexed in Scopus, Science Citation Index Expanded, and the Social Sciences Citation Index. According to the Journal Citation Reports, its 2021 impact factor is 1.896 .

References

External links 
 
 Association of British Paediatric Nurses

SAGE Publishing academic journals
English-language journals
Quarterly journals
Pediatrics journals